The 2010 Southeast Asian haze was an air pollution crisis which affected many Southeast Asia countries such as Indonesia, Malaysia and Singapore during the month of October in 2010.

This occurred during the dry season in October when forest fires were being illegally set off by Indonesian smallholders residing in the districts of Dumai and Bengkalis, in the Riau province of Sumatra. These farmers adopt the slash and burn method to clear off land rapidly for future farming opportunities.

On 18 October, the hotspot count in Sumatra reached a maximum of 358.

Due to the El Nino weather pattern, the westerly winds carried the haze towards Indonesia's neighbouring countries causing the air quality in Malaysia and Singapore to dip towards the moderate to unhealthy range for several days. The hazy conditions not only resulted in the reduction in air quality but also caused poor visibility, multiple closures of schools in Malaysia and an influx of respiratory illnesses.

During that time of the year, the recorded air quality in Singapore then was the worst it had ever been since 2006.

Despite ministers meeting up a week before the crisis for the 6th meeting of the Association of Southeast Asian Nation (ASEAN) agreement, whereby issues on the transboundary haze and methods to tackle forest fires were discussed, the Indonesian government failed to successfully regulate and enforce laws on illegal logging. This caused Indonesia to face much criticism from neighbouring countries.

On 24 October 2010, rainy conditions returned to Indonesia which helped to reduce the production of haze and provided relief to air quality levels.

Causes 

Forest fires are mainly set off illegally by farmers who adopt the slash and burn method to clear large areas of peat and land for future plantation opportunities such as palm oil and pulp wood plantations. Although it is illegal to clear land using the slash and burn method in Indonesia, smallholders choose to ignore the law and to continue with this practice due to its perceived economical and environmental benefits. Not only is the slash and burn method efficient and cost effective, it is also believed to be advantageous towards crop yield and growth. Through the slash and burn method, ash is produced and used as fertilizers by smallholders due to its ability to enhance soil nutrients, balance soil pH levels, eradicate pests as well as prevent the growth of weeds. Furthermore, as  alternate land clearing methods are known to be more expensive and less beneficial, farmers tend to ignore the law and continue with illegal logging activities.

Although land fires contribute a great amount of smoke released into the air, 90% of haze produced originates from peatland fires. Peatland fires are known to have the ability to generate up to 6 times more particulate matter than normal land fires. Additionally, peat fires are commonly found to be 3 to 4 metres underground making it harder to put out fires.

The El Nino weather conditions in 2010 also caused a delay in the monsoon season resulting in a drought and impacting water and crop supplies. Due to the extreme weather patterns faced, farmers were pressured to make up for lost time by illegally setting off forest fires to clear land at a rapid rate. The dry conditions in Indonesia together with the combustible litter left behind from past illegal logging activities played a major role in turning forests and peatlands into potential fire starters.

The large amount of dense smoke produced from the forest fires in Sumatra were then carried by the westerly winds across the Straits of Malacca polluting and deteriorating the air quality in Malaysia and Singapore.

Countries affected

Malaysia 
The cloud of thick smog produced from the forest fires in Indonesia drifted across Malaysia's west coast affecting the capital of Malaysia, Kuala Lumpur and other areas such as Malacca and Johor. Muar, a coastal town located in Johor, experienced a hazardous Air Pollution Index (API) of 432 while the air quality in Malacca deteriorated to an unhealthy API of 106. This caused for government hospitals and clinics to be placed on standby to cater to the high influx of haze related respiratory illnesses.

As a preventive measure, schools in Muar were also shut down to prevent any adverse respiratory illnesses to children and respiratory masks were distributed to the public. Vessels travelling along the Malacca Straits were also advised to travel with caution due to the poor visibility which fell to 2 nautical miles.

Singapore 
The transboundary haze crisis in Singapore lasted for approximately 4 days from 20 October to 23 October 2010. During this period, the overall 24-hour Pollutant Standard Index (PSI), recorded by the National Environment Agency (NEA) was mainly in the high-moderate range while the hourly PSI crept into the unhealthy range of 108. This was the highest PSI recorded since 2006 and the first time in 4 years that the PSI had reached the unhealthy range in Singapore. A nationwide health advisory was issued by the NEA whereby the public was advised to stay hydrated and to refrain from participating in outdoor activities due to the poor air quality and visibility.

Up till the 2010 Southeast Asian haze, Singapore had yet managed to experience a year without any haze related incidences within the last decade. Prior to the 2010 Southeast Asian Haze, Singapore had been experiencing fair air quality within the good to moderate range.

Prior to August 2012, NEA provided 24-hourly PSI updates on the air quality in Singapore once a day at 4pm. Since then, NEA has increased the frequency of PSI updates from once a day to 3 times day to hourly PSI updates in June 2013 for a more accurate representation of the air quality experienced in Singapore.

Negative impacts

Economic 
Due to the transboundary haze, a drop in the percentage of tourists visiting affected countries can be seen during these periods due to the air pollution experienced. During this crisis, travel warnings are often issued out to warn tourists about the deterioration in the air quality and the lack of visibility.

The lack of visibility can bring about many disruptions to the economy, trade and daily life. Due to poor visibility, transportation services like aviation, maritime and land public transport systems are delayed and often put on hold affecting tourism and the daily lives of many individuals. Singapore and Malaysia are countries that rely heavily on trade as being a major source of income and, due to poor visibility, cargo ships carrying goods are forced to travel with caution at a slower pace delaying the shipment process. Furthermore, outdoor constructions are also affected due to the unsafe working conditions.

Not only does this deter tourists from visiting the affected countries, it may also deter prospective migrants who are considering migrating over to seek better living conditions and to take up future job opportunities.

During the worst haze experienced in 1997 which lasted for 3 months, Southeast Asia incurred an estimated loss of $9 billion to health expenses, air travel, retailers, hotels, trade, businesses and tourism.

Health  
As countries such as Malaysia and Singapore are not affected by the transboundary haze throughout the entire year, but usually only during certain months of the year for a short period of time, residents of the affected countries are often prone to short-term health effects brought by the haze rather than long term effects. Individuals who have encountered short term exposure may experience symptoms such as irritation to the eyes, nose and throat due to the haze particles.

Those who are elderly, young, pregnant, asthmatic and with poor immunity such as respiratory illness, lung diseases and cardiovascular diseases are more susceptible to the effects of the haze. When air quality is low, a higher chance of developing breathing difficulties can arise causing multiple health complications and a higher influx of patients in hospitals and clinics.

Environmental 

Indonesia's forest is home to over 3000 animal and plant species such as the Sumatran Tigers, Komodo dragons and orangutans. The destruction of forests by burning practices not only brings about multiple environmental consequences such as soil erosion, water pollution, global warming and climate changes but also threatens the livelihood of multiple animal species pushing many of them to the brink of extinction.

Approximately 80% of Indonesia was forested in 1960s, however less than a 50% remains forested today. This is due to urbanization, corruption and illegal logging activities such as the slash and burn method, which poses a great threat to biodiversity.

For instance, due to burning land clearing methods practiced by smallholders, many species of animals and plants are unable to withstand the high temperatures of heat and fail to escape the fires or successfully migrate to a new home.

Additionally, fire land clearing practices contributes a significant release of greenhouse gases such as carbon dioxide, methane and nitrous oxide. Such release of greenhouse gases from peatland fires aids in the exacerbation of global warming and has the ability to affect a change on the region's climate and weather. It is known that Indonesia is ranked as one of the world's higher carbon emitters with approximately 900 million tons of carbon emitted into the atmosphere in 2010.

Preventive measures

Strengthening governance 

When it comes to issues regarding the transboundary haze and illegal logging, there is no quick or short-term solution to this problem. In order to curb the magnitude and the impact of the haze, Indonesia must first strengthen its government by implementing stricter policies and regulations regarding land access and management. Even though policies and regulations such as obtaining certifications and rights for clearing land purposes are in place, these policies still often fall short due to poor enforcement of laws and corrupt government officials in Indonesia.

As a result, when it comes to illegal logging through the use of the slash and burn method, perpetrators continue to violate the zero-burning policy without any fear of repercussions. This in turn also influences other smallholders to follow suit, making it hard for government officials to monitor and enforce laws thoroughly.  Thus, many government officials end up overlooking those who violate the law while some even go to the extent of rendering aid in the rule breaking process for a small fee.

Over the years, there have been many incidences that have shown how corrupt government officials have aided smallholders and plantation companies in the violation of the rules and regulations set by the Indonesian government. For instance, even though a regulation prohibiting the establishment of oil palm plantations on peatlands which extend more than 3 metres underground has been implemented, it is known that more than 25% of oil palm plantations in Indonesia violates that rule. Additionally, companies such as the Duta Palma which is notoriously known for participating in illegal logging activities manage to escape routine checks by government officials due to the company's deep ties with the Indonesian military. Furthermore, even though many companies and smallholders have had their land clearing licenses revoked due to their participation in the 1997 Southeast Asian Haze, it is known that many of them still continue to ignore the law by clearing land using the slash and burn method.

Additionally, educating and holding smallholders accountable for succumbing to illegal land clearing practices is also imperative in reducing the occurrence of illegal logging.

ASEAN Agreement 

On 13 October 2010, the 6th ASEAN meeting was conducted whereby the transboundary haze issues were discussed. Countries such as Singapore and Malaysia also pledged to support and render aid to Indonesia in its fight against illegal logging and forest fires.

Despite having the 6th ASEAN meeting held a week before the 2010 transboundary haze crisis, Indonesia failed to enforce its logging laws in Sumatra leaving forests vulnerable to destruction. This led to the arise in political tension with neighbouring countries like Malaysia and Singapore.

In order to successfully monitor and minimize the effects of slash and burn activities, the use of techniques to detect emissions and to interpret fire patterns is crucial. Hence, the implementation of the development of a Fire Danger Rating System (FDRS) was endorsed by ministers during the meet as a measure to monitor hotspots and to predict susceptible fire outbreak areas. This system provides the ability to monitor the ignition, occurrence and spread of forest fires based on various conditions such as weather, fuel and soil.

ASEAN has also set a goal to be a haze-free region by 2020.

However, Indonesia may be at risk of losing their leadership position in ASEAN despite being one of ASEAN's founders and having one of the largest economy in Southeast Asia if the government does not uphold and tighten the rules and regulations on illegal logging.

Education 
The education of smallholders is imperative for a notable improvement in the transboundary haze. Although Indonesia's government has banned the clearing of land using the slash and burn method, farmers often disregard the law and continue to clear land illegally using burning practices. This is mainly due to the weak law enforcement and the reluctance to change based on hardened beliefs.

Even though the Indonesian government has attempted to educate and motivate the public on adopting fire-free land clearing alternatives, many smallholders still believe that the benefits of the slash and burn method still outweigh the cost of fire-free land clearing practices. Hence, Indonesia has implemented incentives in the form of rewards and assistance to those who are willing to adopt fire-free land clearing alternatives and to those who comply with Indonesia's zero burning policy. For instance, smallholders are rewarded with funds should they have manage to have a year free of unpermitted burning practices.

Thus, in order for a change to happen, education and public support is important in aiding smallholders to grasp the magnitude and negative impact the slash and burn method has on the environment and neighbouring countries.

References

2010 in Southeast Asia
2010 in Indonesia
2010 in Malaysia
2010 in Singapore
2010 in Thailand
2010 natural disasters
2010 in the environment
Air pollution in Malaysia
Environment of Malaysia
Environment of Singapore
Environment of Thailand
Environmental disasters in Asia
Health disasters in Malaysia
Southeast Asian haze
Fires in Indonesia
Health in Singapore
Health in Thailand